St. Vincent is a hamlet in Kittson County, Minnesota, United States. The population was 57 at the 2020 census.

History 
St. Vincent, which is directly across the Red River from Pembina, was initially incorporated in 1857, just prior to statehood. In 1878, the St. Paul & Pacific Railroad line reached St. Vincent and opened the area to settlement. With the railroad coming through, settlers began arriving to stake their claims. Many of the earliest settlers to what would become Pembina and St. Vincent were Métis, going back to the late 18th century.

Geography

The community is the westernmost community in Minnesota. It is situated on the banks of the Red River of the North, in the Red River Valley. It grew from one of the oldest settlements in the region, when it was part of an early fur-trading post established by Peter Grant in 1793. The city of Pembina, North Dakota borders it on the west, across the Red River of the North.

Minnesota Highway 171, U.S. Highway 75, 8th Street, and Pacific Avenue are four of the main routes in and around the community.

North Dakota Highway 59 and Interstate 29 are also nearby.

Demographics

2010 census
As of the census of 2010, there were 64 people, 29 households, and 18 families living in the city. The racial makeup of the city was 98.4% White and 1.6% Native American. Hispanic or Latino of any race were 6.3% of the population.

There were 29 households, of which 10.3% had children under the age of 18 living with them, 55.2% were married couples living together, 6.9% had a female householder with no husband present, and 37.9% were non-families. 34.5% of all households were made up of individuals, and 17.2% had someone living alone who was 65 years of age or older. The average household size was 2.21 and the average family size was 2.89.

The median age in the city was 49 years. 18.7% of residents were under the age of 18; 6.3% were between the ages of 18 and 24; 17.2% were from 25 to 44; 28.2% were from 45 to 64; and 29.7% were 65 years of age or older. The gender makeup of the city was 54.7% male and 45.3% female.

2000 census
As of the census of 2000, there were 117 people, 48 households, and 28 families living in the city. The racial makeup of the city was 93.16% White, 3.42% Native American, 2.56% Asian, and 0.85% from two or more races.

There were 48 households, out of which 29.2% had children under the age of 18 living with them, 54.2% were married couples living together, 4.2% had a female householder with no husband present, and 39.6% were non-families. 35.4% of all households were made up of individuals, and 14.6% had someone living alone who was 65 years of age or older. The average household size was 2.44 and the average family size was 3.17.

In the city, the population was spread out, with 26.5% under the age of 18, 5.1% from 18 to 24, 27.4% from 25 to 44, 28.2% from 45 to 64, and 12.8% who were 65 years of age or older. The median age was 38 years. For every 100 females, there were 116.7 males. For every 100 females age 18 and over, there were 109.8 males.

The median income for a household in the city was $30,500, and the median income for a family was $41,667. Males had a median income of $22,292 versus $16,250 for females. The per capita income for the city was $13,322. There were 15.4% of families and 21.5% of the population living below the poverty line, including 27.3% of under eighteens and 75.0% of those over 64.

References

External links
St. Vincent Unofficial Page
St. Vincent Memories (Local History)

Cities in Kittson County, Minnesota
Cities in Minnesota